This page covers the seasons from 1970–71 to 1979–80.

1970–71

The club finished the Division One season in sixth place, missing out on European qualification by one place as rivals Dundee pipped them by two points. Aberdeen knocked United out of the Scottish Cup in the fourth round while the club failed to get past the League Cup first round. United were knocked out of the Inter-Cities Fairs Cup in the second round by Czechoslovakian side TJ Sparta ČKD Praha.

1971–72

The club finished the Division One season in ninth place, with Jim McLean beginning a 22-year managerial spell with the club in December 1971, taking over from Jerry Kerr. Aberdeen knocked United out of the Scottish Cup for the second year running, this time in the third round, while the club again failed to get past the League Cup first round. In the Texaco Cup, United were beaten 8–5 on aggregate by eventual winners Derby County in the first round.

1972–73

The club finished the Division One season in seventh place, in Jim McLean's first full season since taking over from Jerry Kerr. Rangers knocked United out of the Scottish Cup third round, while the club reached the League Cup second round. In the Texaco Cup, United were again beaten in the first round, this time on penalties by Leicester City after a 3–3 aggregate draw.

1973–74

The club finished the Division One season in eighth place, again sandwiched between Ayr United and Motherwell. The club reached their first Scottish Cup Final this season, only to be beaten by Celtic. In the League Cup, the club failed to get past the first round while in the Texaco Cup, United were eliminated in the semi-finals after extra time by eventual winners Newcastle United.

1974–75

The club finished the Division One season in fourth place, in the last season before the formation of the Premier Division. The club were knocked out of the Scottish Cup by Aberdeen for the third time in five years, this time in the fourth round, while once again United failed to get past the League Cup first round. In the Cup Winners Cup, United were eliminated in the second round by Turkish side Bursaspor.

1975–76

The club finished the season in eighth place, in the first season of the new Premier Division, avoiding relegation on goal difference. The club were knocked out of the Scottish Cup by Hibernian in the fourth round after a replay, while once again United failed to get past the League Cup first round. In the UEFA Cup, United were eliminated in the second round by Portuguese side Porto.

1976–77

The club finished the season in fourth place, in the second season of the new Premier Division. The club were knocked out of the Scottish Cup by St Mirren in the third round, while once again United failed to get past the League Cup section.

1977–78

The club finished the season in third place in the Premier Division. The club lost to Rangers in the Semi final, United also lost on penalties to Hearts after the sides drew over two legs in the Quarter Final stage. In the UEFA Cup, United were eliminated in the first round by Danish side Copenhagen.

1978–79

The club finished the season in third place, finishing just four points behind champions Celtic. The club were knocked out of the Scottish Cup by St Mirren in the third round, while Celtic knocked United out of the League Cup in the second round. In the UEFA Cup, United were narrowly eliminated in the first round by Belgian side Standard Liège.

1979–80

The club finished the season in fourth place, beating Rangers to a UEFA Cup place on goal difference. The club were knocked out of the Scottish Cup by Rangers in the fourth round, while the club became League Cup Winners for the first time defeating Aberdeen 3-0 in the Final replay at Dens Park after a goalless draw at Hampden. In the UEFA Cup, United were eliminated in the second round by Hungarian side Diósgyőri VTK.

References

1970s in sports
Dundee United F.C.